William Andrews (born 10 October 1977 in Salisbury, now Harare, in the former British colony of Rhodesia, now Zimbabwe) is a British actor and comedian.

Andrews attended Edinburgh College of Art where he gained a Bachelor of Arts in Photography.

He won The Tap water awards for character standup comedy in the 2003 Edinburgh Fringe Festival performing as Tony Carter, a luckless Geordie. In 2007 he won a Scottish BAFTA  for his role in the television show Blowout.

He stars in the BBC children's comedy series, Sorry I've Got No Head, alongside David Armand, James Bachman, Marcus Brigstocke, Anna Crilly, Justin Edwards, Mel Giedroyc, Marek Larwood and Nick Mohammed. He also starred in Pixelface. William Andrews is a board member of The Alternative Comedy Memorial Society.

In 2022 he appeared as Josiah in an episode of Series 4 of Ghosts.

Personal
Andrews is married to British actress and comedian Anna Crilly.

References

British comedians
Living people
1977 births
Alumni of the Edinburgh College of Art